Miss Venezuela 1969 was the 16th edition of Miss Venezuela pageant held at Teatro Paris (now called Teatro La Campiña) in Caracas, Venezuela, on July 1, 1969. The winner of the pageant was María José Yéllici, Miss Aragua.

The pageant was broadcast live by RCTV.

On October, Yellici resigned after 3 months of her reign, and Marzia Piazza, Miss Departamento Vargas was crowned as Miss Venezuela 1969.

Results
Miss Venezuela 1969 - María José Yéllici (Miss Aragua) (resigned)
1st runner-up - Marzia Piazza (Miss Departamento Vargas) (crowned Miss Venezuela 1969 on October, 1969)
2nd runner-up - Cristina Keusch (Miss Miranda)
3rd runner-up - Maritza Celis (Miss Trujillo)
4th runner-up - Maritza Bruzsasco (Miss Bolívar)

Special awards
 Miss Fotogénica (Miss Photogenic) - Maritza Bruzsasco (Miss Bolívar)
 Miss Simpatía (Miss Congeniality) - Magaly Machado (Miss Zulia)
 Miss Sonrisa (Best Smile) - Gloria Rodríguez (Miss Distrito Federal)

Delegates

 Miss Anzoátegui - Beatriz Olivo Chaén
 Miss Apure - Zulaima Molina Tamayo
 Miss Aragua - María José de las Mercedes Yellici Sánchez
 Miss Bolívar - Maritza Bruzsasco
 Miss Carabobo - Nancy Luque Ojeda
 Miss Departamento Vargas - Marzia Piazza Suprani
 Miss Distrito Federal - Gloria Rodríguez Galarraga
  Miss Falcón - Mariela Vaz Capriles
 Miss Guárico - Judith Itriago Toro
 Miss Lara - Sonia De Lima Camacho
 Miss Mérida - Maria Elena González
 Miss Miranda - Cristina Mercedes Keusch Pérez
 Miss Nueva Esparta - Anna Maria Pinoni Pretel
 Miss Portuguesa - Norah Frías Troconis
 Miss Trujillo - Maritza Celis Ydler
 Miss Zulia - Magaly Machado Méndez

External links
Miss Venezuela official website

1969 beauty pageants
1969 in Venezuela